Dudley Wood Stadium also known as Cradley Heath Greyhound Stadium was a greyhound racing and speedway stadium.

Origins
The origins of the track date back to 1917 when the Cradley Heath St Lukes Football Club built a new ground after the First World War because the lease at their previous ground had expired. They found farmland that was suitable for a pitch and constructed a basic football ground and stadium east of the Dudley Wood Road.

Speedway
Cradley Heath speedway team first raced at the stadium on 21 June 1947. The third division "Cubs" became the "Heathens" in the National League Division Two in 1949, and raced continuously until 1952. In 1959 the track reopened for one unlicensed meeting and in 1960 the Heathens entered the newly formed Provincial League. The club then operated continuously, at top flight level from 1965, until 1995 when they were evicted by the new landlords who had bought the stadium to redevelop into housing.

The speedway track measured  with a shape and size modelled on the track at Wembley Stadium. The 4-lap track record (clutch start) of 60.7 seconds was set by Hans Nielsen on 18 July 1990.

Greyhound Racing

Opening
Cradley St Lukes were in debt and after war a betting licence was obtained and Cradley Heath Enterprises started work on the stadium that would include a speedway track. The football club successfully gained permission from Stanley Rous (Football Association) to play on a ground that also held the other sports on the proviso that they did not interfere with the running of the club. So in December 1947 the racing started and the football club decided to sell the ground to the greyhound company for £3,500.

History

Racing continued throughout the 1950s as an independent track (unaffiliated to a governing body) and the football club moved out in 1960. During this time the track continued to apply to the National Greyhound Racing Club (NGRC) for a full licence without success, the first application had been in 1948 had been refused and subsequent applications had all been refused. Finally in 1966 the track then under the management of Fred Jeffcott received the news that they would be under the NGRC banner by the end of the year. NGRC racing began in September 1966 under the supervision of Racing Manager Lionel Clemmow and a new competition called the Golden Hammer was inaugurated in 1968. The first winner of the event was Shannon Water from Perry Barr. The event was suspended after the 1972 running until 1983 due to the fact that the track flittered in and out of NGRC status.

Derek Pugh a former Monmore trainer purchased the track and introduced the popular Cradley sales trials during the eighties as the auctioneers Hall, Wateridge and Owen held regular events. The Bridgewater family also had a stake in the company and despite the limitations of the venue there were eight bookmakers, a manual tote and automatic ray timing. Racing was held on Tuesday and Friday nights with trials on Wednesday mornings, the circumference of the circuit was 413 metres with distances of 231, 272, 462 and 647 metres behind an 'Outside McGee' hare.

Success
Pineapple Choice won the 1980 Stow Marathon, Red Prim trained by Jim Barrett claimed the 1981 Eclipse Stakes. Michael and Barbara Compton's Pineapple Barrow reached the 1982 English Greyhound Derby final and won the St Mungo Cup, the Ken Reynolds trained Slender Boy was victorious in the 1983 Northern Flat and the puppy Glenamona lifted the 1983 Trafalgar Cup.

Closure
Cradley Heath closed its doors in 1995 and the stadium was demolished in 1998 by the new owners (Barratt Homes), despite not receiving planning permission for their home development project.

Golden Hammer winners
				
1968-72 (500y), 1973-82 (not held), 1983-90 (462m)

Track records

External links
Cradley Heath Speedway website

References 

Defunct greyhound racing venues in the United Kingdom
Defunct speedway venues in England
Demolished buildings and structures in the West Midlands (county)
Defunct sports venues in the West Midlands (county)
Sports venues completed in 1947